Establishment of a port is the technical expression for the time that elapses between the moon's transit across the meridian at new or full moon at a given place and the time of high water at that place. The interval (constant at any one place) may vary from 6 minutes (Harwich) to 11 hours 45 minutes (North Foreland). At London Bridge it is 1 hour 58 minutes.

External links

References

Time in astronomy